Parliamentary elections were held in Algeria on 5 June 1997. The result was a victory for the National Rally for Democracy (RND), a new party created in early 1997 for President Zéroual's supporters, which won 156 out of 380 seats. They were followed by the Movement of Society for Peace (as Hamas had been required to rename itself) with 69 seats, the FLN (62), and the Islamist Ennahda (34). The two Berberist parties, FFS and RCD, got 20 and 19 seats respectively. Views on this election were mixed; most major opposition parties filed complaints, and the success of the extremely new RND raised eyebrows. The RND, FLN, and MSP formed a coalition government, with the RND's Ahmed Ouyahia as prime minister.

Voter turnout was 65.6%.

Results

References

Algerian Civil War
Elections in Algeria
Algeria
1997 in Algeria
Election and referendum articles with incomplete results